Charles Baxter (born 24 June 1981) is a former New Zealand Rugby union player. He played for the All Blacks Sevens and made his debut in 2002.

In 2011 he was selected as the Bay of Plenty sevens coach.

References

External links
All Blacks Profile

1981 births
New Zealand international rugby sevens players
Living people